Kimchi is a Korean side dish made from pickled vegetables.

Kimchi may also refer to:
Kimhi or Kimchi, surname
Kimchi (software), a web management tool to manage KVM infrastructure
Kimchi, an ethnic slur used for a Korean
Kim Chi (drag queen) (b. 1987), a contestant on RuPaul's Drag Race (season 8)

See also
 
 Steve Lombardi, professional wrestler who worked for a while under the name Kim Chee